In the Passing Light of Day is the tenth studio album by Swedish band Pain of Salvation, released on 13 January 2017 via InsideOut Music. A concept album like every other by the band, the lyrics focus on mortality, death and the joys and angers of life. The album is dedicated to "my lover, my best friend", in reference to Daniel Gildenlöw's wife Johanna Iggsten.

Album information
The album was conceived in 2014 when bandleader Daniel Gildenlöw contracted a life-threatening flesh eating bacteria. Hospitalized in Uppsala, Sweden, he was forced to sit out of Transatlantic's KaLIVEoscope tour. While receiving treatment Gildenlöw wrote the songs that became the basic premise of the album, including the 15 minute title track.

The song is about Daniel’s wife Johanna and the life they've spent together. It makes reference to "A Trace of Blood" from Remedy Lane, written about Johanna's miscarriage. In fact, Gildenlöw has referred to this album as Remedy Lane II due to its repeated use of themes found throughout the original's songs.

Track listing

Special edition bonus CD

Personnel
Daniel Gildenlöw – vocals, guitar
Ragnar Zolberg – guitar, vocals
Gustaf Hielm – bass, vocals
Daniel "D2" Karlsson – keyboards, vocals
Léo Margarit – drums, vocals

Guest musicians
Peter Kvint – bass, mellotron and backing vocals on "Silent Gold"
Camilla Arvidsson – violin
David Ra-Champari – violin
Anette Kumlin – oboe, English horn
Hálfdán Árnason – double bass

Charts

References

External links

2017 albums
Inside Out Music albums
Pain of Salvation albums